Peter Wetzlar (born 27 February 1997) is a Zimbabwean swimmer. He attended Westville Boys' High School in Durban, South Africa and the University of Kentucky.  He competed in the men's 100 metre freestyle event at the 2017 World Aquatics Championships.

In 2019, he represented Zimbabwe at the 2019 World Aquatics Championships held in Gwangju, South Korea, and he finished in 44th place in the heats in the men's 50 metre freestyle event. In the men's 100 metre freestyle he finished in 56th place in the heats.

He competed at the 2020 Summer Olympics.

References

External links

1997 births
Living people
Zimbabwean male freestyle swimmers
Place of birth missing (living people)
African Games competitors for Zimbabwe
Kentucky Wildcats men's swimmers
Swimmers at the 2015 African Games
Swimmers at the 2019 African Games
Swimmers at the 2020 Summer Olympics
Olympic swimmers of Zimbabwe
20th-century Zimbabwean people
21st-century Zimbabwean people